Things Never Said is a 2013 American drama film written and directed by Charles Murray and starring Shanola Hampton, Omari Hardwick and Elimu Nelson.

Cast
Shanola Hampton
Omari Hardwick
Elimu Nelson
Michael Beach
Tamala Jones
Dorian Missick

Release
The film premiered at the Greater Cleveland Urban Film Festival in April 2013.  Codeblack Films acquired U.S. distribution rights to the film in June 2013.  The film was released in theaters on September 6, 2013.

Reception
The film has a 67% rating on Rotten Tomatoes.  Christy Lemire of RogerEbert.com awarded the film two stars.  Carrie Rickey of The Philadelphia Inquirer awarded the film two and a half stars out of four.  Andrea Thompson of Patch graded the film a B+.

References

External links
 
 

American drama films
2013 drama films
2013 films
2010s English-language films
2010s American films